Berrian was an unincorporated community in Benton County, Washington, United States, located approximately nine miles east of Umatilla, Oregon on the north bank of the Columbia River.

The community was named after Augustus F. Berrian who settled in the area in 1884. In February 1913, the community was officially platted by the Commercial Orchard Land Company. Berrian had a post office from April 25, 1913 to April 30, 1949.

References

Unincorporated communities in Benton County, Washington
Northern Pacific Railway
Unincorporated communities in Washington (state)